Zeta Andromedae (Zeta And, ζ Andromedae, ζ And) is a star system in the constellation Andromeda. It is approximately 189 light-years from Earth.

Zeta Andromedae is the star's Bayer designation.  It also has the Flamsteed designation 34 Andromedae and multiple other designations in stellar catalogues.

Location

The star's location is in the northern constellation Andromeda, in which it is the second-most southerly of the stars in this often drawn characteristic shape representing the mythical princess asterism, after η Andromedae.

System

The system is a spectroscopic binary whose  is classified as an orange K-type giant with a mean apparent magnitude of +4.08. Due to brightness changes caused by the ellipsoidal shape of that object, the system is also an RS Canum Venaticorum-type variable star. Its brightness varies from magnitude +3.92 to +4.14 with a period of 17.77 days, and its spectrum shows strong and variable Ca II H and K lines. The orbital period of the binary is 17.77 days.

Direct imaging
The primary component of this binary system, Zeta Andromedae Aa, is one of the few stars who has been imaged directly using Doppler imaging and long-baseline infrared interferometry. With direct imaging we can recover additional information about this star.

Direct imaging also allowed observation of starspots (the analogue to sunspots), on this star, and their asymmetric distribution showed that the magnetic field of the star is generated by a mechanism different from the solar dynamo. A Sun-like differential rotation of the star was observed instead.

Visual companions
The WDS notes three visual companions to the eclipsing binary (Aa and Ab, forming binary A). The parallax of the D star has been measured by Gaia proving its distance to be much greater than Zeta Andromedae, probably a distant red giant.  The closest companion, B, is likewise a background object.  The companion C at  shares a common proper motion and a similar parallax.

Naming

Notes

References

External links
 Zeta Andromedae  at Alcyone Software's Star Data Pages
 Image ζ Andromedae
 Rachael Roettenbacher, "How the face of a distant star reveals our place in the cosmos," Aeon Magazine [retrieved July 27, 2016]

Andromeda (constellation)
K-type giants
Andromedae, Zeta
Andromedae, 34
004502
003693
Spectroscopic binaries
RS Canum Venaticorum variables
Rotating ellipsoidal variables
5 
BD+23 0106
K-type main-sequence stars
0215